Feroke, is a Municipality and a part of Kozhikode metropolitan area under Kozhikode Development Authority (K.D.A) in the Kozhikode district of the Indian state of Kerala.

Feroke municipality shares the border with Kozhikode corporation, Ramanattukara municipality and kadalundi panchayat.

Feroke is located 11 km away from Kozhikode city.

Feroke is developing as a Suburb of kozhikode city and Feroke is a part of Kozhikode urban area masterplan.

Name
The village was originally named Farookhabad by Tippu Sultan. Later, this was changed to Feroke by the British. Tipu Sulthan wanted to make Feroke as his capital in Malabar. The remains of a fort built by Tipu Sultan still stands in Feroke with a long tunnel to the river. Authorities are trying to preserve the fort remains as a site of historical importance. The old bridge at Feroke was built by the British in 1883.

History
Feroke, on the southern bank of Chaliyar river, was adjacent to the kingdom of Parappanad during medieval period. The rulers of Parappanad were vassals to the Zamorin of Calicut. The headquarters of Parappanad Royal family was the coastal town of Parappanangadi in present-day Malappuram district. In 15th century CE, Parappanad Swaroopam was divided into two - Northern Parappanad (Beypore Swaroopam) and Southern Parappanad (Parappur Swaroopam). Beypore, Cheruvannur, and Panniyankara, on northern bank of Chaliyar, became Northern Parappanad. Kadalundi, Vallikkunnu, and Parappanangadi, on the southern bank of Chaliyar became Southern Parappanad.

It is also known the ruler of the Kingdom of Tanur (Vettathunadu Swaroopam), had assisted the Portuguese to build a fort at the island of Chaliyam, which was a part of Southern Parappanad, and was destructed during the Battle at Chaliyam fort occurred in 1571. Feroke became a part of the Kingdom of Mysore in late 18th century CE. Following the Third Anglo-Mysore War and the subsequent Treaty of Seringapatam, Feroke became a part of Malabar District under British Raj. Feroke was included in Eranad Taluk in the Malappuram Revenue Division of Malabar District with its Taluk headquarters at Manjeri. Following the formation of the state of Kerala in 1956, Feroke became a part of Tirurangadi Revenue block of Tirur Taluk. On 16 June 1969, Eranad Taluk, Tirur Taluk, Tirurangadi, and Parappanangadi, were transferred to newly formed Malappuram district. However, three Revenue Villages of Tirur Taluk, namely, Feroke, Ramanattukara, and Kadalundi, remained in Kozhikode district, as they were much closer to Kozhikode city centre. However Kadalundi Nagaram beach (where Kadalundi River flows into Arabian Sea, a part of Vallikkunnu Grama Panchayat), Tenhipalam, the centre of University of Calicut,  and Karippur, the site of Calicut International Airport, became parts of Malappuram.

Feroke, Ramanattukara, and Kadalundi are parts of Kozhikode Taluk and Kozhikode metropolitan area.

Demographics
As of the 2001 India census, Feroke had a population of 29,504. Males constitute 49% of the population and females 51%. In Feroke, 13% of the population is under 6 years of age.

As of the 2011 India census,
The Feroke Census Town has population of 32,122 of which 15,596 are males while 16,526 are females.

Population of Children with age of 0-6 is 3979 which is 12.39% of total population of Feroke (CT). In Feroke Census Town, Female Sex Ratio is of 1060 against state average of 1084. Moreover, the Child Sex Ratio in Feroke is around 969 compared to Kerala state average of 964. Literacy rate of Feroke city is 95.99% higher than state average of 94.00%. In Feroke, Male literacy is around 97.67% while female literacy rate is 94.42%.

Civic Administration

Feroke Municipality Election 2020

Election Results

Industry

Feroke is the cradle of the tile industry in Kerala. The rapid rivers from the Western Ghats after passing through forests carry the clay which is the raw-material for tiles, pottery and ceramic wares. There are more than a dozen tile factories in Feroke. Feroke is also well known for its wood and Timber industries.

Cheruvannur and Feroke are predominant industrial areas of Kozhikode. A number of tile factories, match factories, Timber industries, Automobile dealerships, Footwear industries, steel factories, etc. are located here, providing employment to thousands of workers. The Steel Complex is also located here.

Farook College
Farook College is the biggest educational organization of Feroke area.  The college was started in 1948 and enjoys autonomous status from 2015. It is the largest residential post-graduate institution affiliated with the University of Calicut.
The college is located on a hillock originally called 'Irumooli Paramba' 5 km from Feroke Railway Station and 16 km from the city of Calicut and at a distance of 16 km from the Calicut Airport. The entire campus comprising the college, its hostels, the staff quarters and its sister concerns covers an area of 70 acres. The entire village is popularly called 'Farook College' and has a post office called Farook College.

Temples and kavu

  Nallur Shiva Kshethram
 Mullassery Kavu, Chulliparamba
  Pallithara Shri Kurumba Bhagavathi Kshethram
  Valakkada Kshethram
  Kizhakke Kavu
  Padinjare Kavu
  Cheruvannur Subhramanya Swami kshethram
  Parambath kavu Temple
  Karayi Temple
  Pottathil Sree Bhagavathi temple
  Odayalathodi Bhagavathi temple
  Madathodi Kavu
  Pareekatu Kavu
  Choppan Kavu
 Pootheri Kavu

Hospitals
 Koyas Hospital
 Employees' State Insurance Hospital, Feroke
 Red Crescent Hospital, Chungam.   
 Shifa hospital, kallampara
 Govt. Taluk Hospital, Chanda Feroke

Places of Interest near Feroke

Edavannappara
Edavannappara is a very scenic village near Feroke and there is a lot of tourist potential here. The undulating hills in the neighbouring villages can be utilized to make it a world class picnic location. It is located in Malappuram district. Three kilometres away lies the even more attractive Elamaram village on the Chaliyar river. There is a ferry service here that can take you to the northern side of the Chaliyar river. The ticket is Rs.5.00 and the motor boat service is available every half an hour between 6.40 a.m. and 8.40 p.m. including Sundays.ShoppingEven though this a tiny village, the shopping facilities available are quite surprisingly elaborate. The MC Mall in the heart of the town looks like an upmarket city facility. There are also many theme restaurants here. It appears that the villagers here have a flair for good living.

Beypore (5 km)

The place was formerly known as Vaypura and Vadaparappanad. Tippu Sultan named the town "Sultan Pattanam". It is one of the important ports of Kerala and an important trading centre.

Beypore is known for its boat building yard where mammoth crafts known as urus are built. It is a major fishing harbour of Kerala. There are two man made extensions to the sea to facilitate easy access for fishing boats.

Chaliyam (4 km)
Chaliyam is an island in Kadalundi Amsom formed by the Beypore and Kadalundi rivers, and it  was formerly the terminus of the Madras Railway. The bridge at Feroke which extended the railway up to Kozhikode in 1888, reduced the importance of Chaliyam.

Irshadiya College (3 km)
Irshadiya College is an educational institution located in Paruthippara road. It has a historic experience of nearly four decades in the educational purview of Feroke. Its main peculiarly is that it offers courses in both arts and Islamic studies. Hundreds of students are studying from in and outside of Kerala.

RCCM College (1 km)
RCCM College is an exclusive educational institution for commerce students located in cheruvannur. it has nine years' experience in college-level education at Feroke. It makes good results in previous nine years in Feroke area. Its main aim is to provide quality education to all students. Courses offered: B.Com., BBA, CA, CMA, M.com. and Plusone, Plustwo.

Karuvanthuruthy
Karuvanthuruthy is a fishing village near Feroke. It is surrounded on sides with water giving the name 'thiruth' to it. This village is located on the western side of Feroke railway station.  The underbridge from Feroke town goes to Karuvanthuruthy town and the Karuvanthuruthy bridge connects the town to Chaliyam beach and seawalk.

Kadalundi (6 km)
Kadalundi is one of the oldest towns in Kerala and is an example of the old ports called "thundies". The tidal/mangrove forest on the banks of the Kadalundi river make it a picturesque area. The deltas formed by the Kadalundi river add to the beauty of the place. The town is divided into two by the river— Kadalundi in the Kozhikode district and Kadalundi Nagaram in Malappuram district. Thousands of migratory birds from all over the world gather here starting in November.

Major Landmarks
 University of Calicut, 9 km
 Farook College,  3 km
 Alfarook College, 3 km
 Red Crescent Hospital, 3 km
 Medical collage Kozhikode, 17 km
 Calicut Airport, 17 km
 Kadalundi Bird Sanctuary 7.4 km
 Beypore Beach, 6 km

Villages and Suburbs
 Chandakkadavu, Pettah and Chungam
 Karuvanthuruthi, Thirichilangadi and Kokkivalavu
 Adivaram, Melevaram and Irumoolipparamba
 Perumugham and Pullikkadavu.
 Kallampara
 Nallur
 Puttekadu
 Chenaparamba
 Karad
 Feroke Railway Station

Location

Image gallery

See also
 Kadalundi Bird Sanctuary
 Paruthippara
 Farook College
 Ramanattukara
 Cheruvannur
 Karuvanthiruthy
 Kadalundi
 Chelembra

References

Cities and towns in Kozhikode district
Tourist attractions in Kozhikode
Kozhikode south